Brian Duppa (also spelled Bryan; 10 March 1589 – 26 March 1662) was an English bishop, chaplain to the royal family, Royalist and adviser to Charles I of England.

Life
He was educated at Westminster School and Christ Church, Oxford, graduating BA in 1609. He was a Fellow of All Souls College, Oxford in 1612. According to the list of Vicars in Westham Church he was vicar at this Sussex parish from 1625 and Vice-Chancellor of the University of Oxford in 1632. He became chaplain to Edward Sackville, 4th Earl of Dorset, who as his patron helped him become Dean of Christ Church.

He was chaplain to Charles I from 1634, and tutor to his two sons. He was regarded as a follower of William Laud. He was involved in the approval by Charles I of the manuscript of Eikon Basilike, reading it to the King in Carisbrooke Castle.

Duppa was made Bishop of Chichester (1638). From two years later (marking the start of the Civil War) until death he lived much more quietly at Richmond, (as Bishop of Salisbury from 1641), one of the few Anglican bishops to remain alive throughout the English Interregnum to retake their Sees at the Restoration. He was deprived of the See of Salisbury by Parliament on 9 October 1646, and episcopacy was abolished for the duration of the Commonwealth and the Protectorate.

In 1660, on the return from exile of Charles II of England to restore the monarchy, Duppa was briefly restored to Salisbury, but swiftly made Bishop of Winchester and Lord Almoner. He legally took up the See of Winchester by the confirmation of his election on 4 October 1660.

He died two years later. His tomb monument in Westminster Abbey was created by Balthasar Burman, the son of Thomas Burman.

Works
He was editor of Jonsonus Virbius (1638), a collection of memorial verses from various authors for Ben Jonson.

Eponymous places
Two places bear his name given mostly to sports fields: Bishop Duppas Park in Lower Halliford, Shepperton, Surrey and seemingly Duppas Hill in Waddon, Croydon, London reflecting his influence on the ex-ecclesiastical land.

Two sets of almshouses were erected with his funds or endowed with his lands: one with original components; one with 19th-century replacement such housing:
Duppa's Almshouses, Pembridge, Herefordshire
Bishop Duppa's Almshouses, Richmond, London owned by Richmond Charities.

In literature
Bishop Duppa appears in Robert Neil's historical novel "Crown and Mitre", set in 1659. In the last days of the Commonwealth the Bishop, living at a modest house in Richmond, is shown having a clandestine meeting with the emissaries of the exile King Charles II, to discuss plans for the Restoration.

Notes

References
Gyles Isham, Justinian Isham (editors), The Correspondence of Bishop Brian Duppa and Sir Justinian Isham, 1650–1660, Publications of the Northamptonshire Record Society Volume XVII

External links
Project Canterbury page

 

1589 births
1662 deaths
17th-century Church of England bishops
Alumni of Christ Church, Oxford
Arminian ministers
Arminian writers
Bishops of Chichester
Bishops of Salisbury
Bishops of Winchester
Deans of Christ Church, Oxford
Fellows of All Souls College, Oxford
People educated at Westminster School, London
People from Lewisham
Burials at Westminster Abbey
16th-century Anglican theologians
17th-century Anglican theologians